Kütahya station is a station in the city of Kütahya, Turkey. The station is on the northern perimeter of the city and despite Kütahya having a population over 200,000, it is the only station in the city. Originally opened on 30 December 1894 by the Ottoman Anatolian Railway, the station is now owned by the Turkish State Railways.

TCDD Taşımacılık operates five daily trains, all from Eskişehir. Out of these five trains, two are mainline service while the other three are regional trains.

References

Railway stations in Kütahya Province
Railway stations opened in 1894
1894 establishments in the Ottoman Empire